Eva Amurri (born March 15, 1985) is an American lifestyle blogger and actress.

Early life
Amurri was born on March 15, 1985, in New York City, to Italian director Franco Amurri and American actress Susan Sarandon (whose mother's ancestry was Italian). Amurri was raised by her mother and her mother's long-time partner Tim Robbins. She has two maternal half-brothers, Jack and Miles, as well as two paternal half-siblings, Leone and Augusta, from her father's marriage to Heide Lund, and two stepsisters, Tallulah and Ruby, from Lund's previous marriage to a British aristocrat.

She attended Friends Seminary (Manhattan) for middle school, and graduated from Saint Ann's School in Brooklyn, New York, and Brown University.

Career
Amurri had a role in the 2002 film The Banger Sisters, in which her mother starred, with Amurri playing the daughter of her mother's character. She guest-starred, along with her mother, on an episode of Friends in Season 7 Episode 15 ("The One with Joey's New Brain") in which she is slapped by Sarandon. In 2004, she appeared in Saved!. She guest-hosted Attack of the Show with Kevin Pereira. She had a role in the third season of the Showtime series Californication, where she played Jackie, a stripper, student and love interest of central character Hank Moody. Amurri played the leading role in the 2008 film Middle of Nowhere.

In 2009, she appeared as Shelly in the episode "The Playbook" of How I Met Your Mother. Amurri starred in the thriller film Isolation, directed by Stephen T. Kay.

In 2010, she appeared in the Fox series House as Nicole in the episode "The Choice". In 2012, she appeared in Happy Madison Productions' That's My Boy as young Mary McGarricle. Her mother also appeared in the film as McGarricle's older self.

Amurri began her popular lifestyle blog "Happily Eva After" in 2015.

Personal life
Amurri married former Major League Soccer player and former NBC Sports broadcaster Kyle Martino on October 29, 2011, in Charleston, South Carolina. They have three children: daughter Marlowe Mae was born on August 9, 2014, son Major James was born on October 19, 2016 and son Mateo Antoni was born March 13, 2020. In August 2015, Amurri revealed she had a miscarriage at nine weeks. On November 15, 2019, Amurri and Martino announced that they were separating, just two months after they announced they were expecting their third child together. As of March 2020, the couple finalized their divorce. Amurri resides in Westport, Connecticut. Amurri announced her engagement to Ian Hock in Paris, France over social media on Feb 21, 2023. Hock and Amurri had been dating two years.

Filmography

Film

Television

References

External links

 
 
 
 Happily Eva After (lifefstyle blog)

1985 births
20th-century American actresses
21st-century American actresses
Actresses from Connecticut
Actresses from New York City
American child actresses
American film actresses
American people of English descent
American people of Irish descent
American people of Italian descent
American people of Welsh descent
American television actresses
Brown University alumni
Friends Seminary alumni
Living people
People from Pound Ridge, New York
People from Westport, Connecticut
Saint Ann's School (Brooklyn) alumni
Association footballers' wives and girlfriends